Haldibari High School, established in 1940, is one of the oldest schools in Haldibari in West Bengal, India.

It is affiliated with WBBSE (IX-X) and WBCHSE (XI-XII).

Gallery

See also
Education in India
List of schools in India
Education in West Bengal

References

External links
 
 Facebook Fanpage

High schools and secondary schools in West Bengal
Schools in Cooch Behar district
Educational institutions established in 1940
1940 establishments in India